Konyaspor KIF is a  Turkish football club located in AStockholm County.

Background
Konyaspor Kultur och IF were founded in 1989 and have Turkish cultural roots, being based among the Turks in Sweden. The club's name and colours comes from the Turkish team Konyaspor.

Since their foundation Konyaspor KIF has participated mainly in the middle and lower divisions of the Swedish football league system.  The club currently plays in Division 2 Norra Svealand which is the fourth tier of Swedish football. They play their home matches at the Alby IP in Norsborg.

Konyaspor KIF are affiliated to the Stockholms Fotbollförbund.

Season to season

Footnotes

External links
 Konyaspor KIF – Official website

Football clubs in Stockholm
Association football clubs established in 1989
1989 establishments in Sweden
Turkish association football clubs outside Turkey
Diaspora sports clubs